Mardukhel Banda is a village in the Hangu District, Khyber Pakhtunkhwa Province, Pakistan.

References 

Populated places in Hangu District, Pakistan